The Louis Stephan House is a 1-story Bungalow in Boise, Idaho, designed by Tourtellotte & Hummel and constructed in 1915. The house features a modest, rectangular design with a ridgebeam running perpendicular to the street, front and back gables, and an enclosed porch behind "four blocky battered posts with plain battered capitals." The house was added to the National Register of Historic Places in 1982.

Louis Stephan and his sons owned Boise's Imperial Bakery, and Stephan was president of the Stephan Baking Co. During World War I and at the time of his death in 1933, he was known as Ludwig Stephan.

Notes

References

External links

		
National Register of Historic Places in Boise, Idaho
Houses completed in 1915
Tourtellotte & Hummel buildings
Bungalow architecture in Idaho